Air Cairo is a low-fare airline based in Cairo, Egypt. The airline is part owned by Egyptair. Air Cairo operates scheduled flights to the Middle East and Europe and also operates charter flights to Egypt from Europe on behalf of tour operators. Its base is Cairo International Airport, Sharm El Sheikh International Airport and Hurghada International Airport with the company head office in the Sheraton Heliopolis Zone.

History 

The airline was established in 2003. It is owned by Egyptair (60%), the National Bank of Egypt (20%) and Bank Misr (20%).

Recently, the company is re-modeling towards the low fare model which is planned to be the strongest low fare airline in Egypt. On 1 June 2012 Air Cairo launched its first ever scheduled flight from Borg El Arab Airport Alexandria to Kuwait International Airport, Queen Alia International Airport, King Abdulaziz International Airport, Tripoli International Airport, Sabha Airport,
Misrata Airport and King Khaled International Airport. Air Cairo also launched its scheduled flights from Hurghada International Airport to Belgrade Nikola Tesla Airport. But those flights were suspended in the end of December 2015.

On 5 November 2018, it was reported that the German aviation authority had banned Air Cairo - along with FlyEgypt - from flying to Germany, where it operated on behalf of German tour operators, due to regulatory violations. Shortly afterward major European tour operators such as Thomas Cook Group and TUI Group announced they would end their contracts with Air Cairo and FlyEgypt.

In March 2019, it was reported that the airline would be leasing Embraer 170 aircraft for operations on the airline's domestic routes within Egypt.

In March 2021, Air Cairo announced it was to make a major push into the German-speaking market, having signed a sales cooperation agreement with SunExpress to market and manage up to 30 flights per week to the Red Sea resort of Hurghada from 14 airports in Germany, Austria, and Switzerland. Under the agreement, SunExpress will take care of all flight planning, revenue management, and sales; with Air Cairo operating the flights. In the course of the partnership, SunExpress and Air Cairo planned to expand the venture to other airports outside of German-speaking countries, SunExpress said in a statement. Air Cairo Chairman and Chief Executive Officer Hussein Sherif said the Benelux countries would be targeted next. The aim of the sales push was to boost tourism to Egypt to pre-COVID-19 levels.

Destinations
As of January 2023, Air Cairo operates scheduled services - without leisure charters - to the following airports:

Codeshare agreements
Air Cairo has codeshare agreements with the following airlines:

 Egyptair

In addition, Air Cairo has a sales cooperation agreement with SunExpress to market and manage up to 30 flights per week to the Red Sea resort of Hurghada from 14 airports in Germany, Austria, and Switzerland.

Fleet

As of December 2022, the Air Cairo fleet consists of the following aircraft:

References

External links

 

Airlines of Egypt
Airlines established in 2003
Arab Air Carriers Organization members
Companies based in Cairo
Low-cost carriers
Egyptian companies established in 2003

ko:카이로 항공